The Kingdom of Georgia, also known as the Georgian Empire, was a medieval Eurasian monarchy that was founded in  AD. It reached its Golden Age of political and economic strength during the reign of King David IV and Queen Tamar the Great from 11th to 13th centuries. Georgia became one of the pre-eminent nations of the Christian East and its pan-Caucasian empire and network of tributaries stretching from Eastern Europe to Anatolia and northern frontiers of Iran, while also maintaining religious possessions abroad, such as the Monastery of the Cross in Jerusalem and the Monastery of Iviron in Greece. It was the principal historical precursor of present-day Georgia.
 
Lasting for several centuries, the kingdom fell to the Mongol invasions in the 13th century, but managed to re-assert sovereignty by the 1340s. The following decades were marked by the Black Death, as well as numerous invasions under the leadership of Timur, who devastated the country's economy, population, and urban centers. The Kingdom's geopolitical situation further worsened after the fall of the Byzantine and then Empire of Trebizond by the Ottoman Turks. As a result of these processes, by the end of the 15th century Georgia turned into a fractured entity. This whole series of events also led to the final collapse of the kingdom into anarchy by 1466 and the mutual recognition of its constituent kingdoms of Kartli, Kakheti, and Imereti as independent states between 1490 and 1493—each led by a rival branch of the Bagrationi dynasty, and into five semi-independent principalities—Odishi, Guria, Abkhazia, Svaneti, and Samtskhe.

Background 

Early Georgian kingdoms were reduced to feudal regions over the course of the Roman–Persian wars. The area then fell under the control of the early Muslim conquests of the 7th century.

Iberian princes from the Bagrationi dynasty fought against the Arab occupation and came to rule the Tao-Klarjeti region. They established the Kouropalatate of Iberia as a nominal vassal of the Byzantine Empire. By 888, they had gained control of the central Georgian land, Kartli, and restored the Iberian kingship. The Bagrationi dynasty was unable to maintain their kingdom, and it was divided between the three branches of the family. The main branch controlled Tao, while another controlled Klarjeti.

In 736, Marwan ibn Muhammad's invasion of Georgia was repelled by Abkhazians, Lazic and Iberian allies. This successful defense along with increasing struggles against Byzantium helped lead to a process of unification of the Georgian states into a single feudal monarchy. The Georgian Church broke away from Constantinople in the 9th century, instead recognizing the authority of the Catholicate of Mtskheta. The church language was changed from Greek to Georgian.

History

Unification of the Georgian State 

During the 10th century, David III of Tao invaded the Duchy of Kartli, giving it to his adopted son, who would later be known as Bagrat III of Georgia, with his biological father, Gurgen of Iberia, as regent. In 994, Gurgen was crowned King of the Iberians. In 975, supported by the Duke of Kartli Ivane Marushidze and David, Bagrat claimed the throne of Kartli, becoming King of the Kartlians. During this time, the Kingdom of Abkhazia in what is today northeastern Georgia was under the rule of Theodosius the Blind, who did away with Abkhazian traditions. In 978, the Abkhazian aristocracy, dissatisfied with the rule of Theodosius, performed a coup d'état and invited Bagrat to claim the throne of Abkhazia.

Gurgen died in 1008, leaving his throne for Bagrat, allowing Bagrat to become the first king of a unified Abkhazia and Iberia. In his early reign, Bagrat pressed a claim to the kingdom of Khakheti-Hereti to the east, and annexed it in 1010. Bagrat also reduced the autonomy of dynastic princes to stabilize his realm, with his fears focusing on the Klarjeti line of the Bagrationi. In order to secure the throne for his son, George I of Georgia, Bagrat tricked his cousins into a meeting and imprisoned them, and his cousins' children fled to Constantinople, where they requested the aid of the Byzantine Empire to take back their patrimonial land.

Bagrat's reign secured a victory for the Bagratids of Georgia, ending the power-struggles that had plagued the region for centuries. Bagrat had a peaceful foreign policy, successfully avoiding conflicts with the Byzantines and nearby Muslim realms, even though some of David's territory, such as Tao and Tbilisi, remained in Byzantine and Arab control, respectively.

War and peace with Byzantium 

George I's reign was known primarily for its war against the Byzantines. This war had its roots in the 990s, when David III, after losing a rebellion against the Byzantine Emperor Basil II, agreed to cede his lands in Tao to the emperor upon his death. George I, in an attempt to take back the Kuropalates' land, occupied Tao starting from 1015 or 1016, during a Byzantine war with the Bulgarian Empire. When Bulgaria was dealt with in 1021, Basil II turned his attention to Georgia, leading to a two-year-long war and an eventual Byzantine victory. George, as a result, had to abandon his claims in Tao and surrender some of his southwestern lands, which were eventually made into the theme of Iberia. George's son, who would eventually become Bagrat IV, was also given to Basil as a hostage.

Bagrat IV spent the next three years in Constantinople, being released in 1025. George I's death in 1027 saw him succeeded by the 8-year-old Bagrat. By the time Bagrat ascended to the throne, the Bagratids' unification drive had gained much momentum. Many of the Georgian lands, such as Tao, Tbilisi, Kakheti and Hereti, were either under the rule of foreign empires or of independent kings. The loyalty of Georgian nobles was also questionable. Bagrat IV's childhood saw the regency increase the influence of the nobility, something which he tried to stop when he assumed his full powers.

Great Turkish Invasion 

In the later half of the 11th century, the Seljuq Turks invaded nearby regions, prompting greater cooperation between the Georgian and Byzantine governments. In a political arrangement, Bagrat's daughter Maria married the Byzantine co-emperor Michael VII Ducas at some point between 1066 and 1071.

In 1065 the Seljuk sultan Alp Arslan attacked Kartli, taking Tbilisi and building a mosque. During the internecine conflict between Seljuk heirs, George II of Georgia defeated a Seljuk governor, Sarang of Ganja, at the Battle of Partskhisi in 1074. In 1076, the Seljuk sultan Malik Shah I attacked again. Georgia eventually submitted to Malik Shah, paying an annual tribute in order to have peace.

Georgian Reconquista

David IV 

George II ceded the crown to his 16-year-old son David IV in 1089. Under the tutelage of his court minister, George of Chqondidi, David IV suppressed the feudal lords and centralized the power. In 1089–1100, he organized military action to destroy Seljuk troops, beginning the resettlement of occupied regions. In 1099, David IV refused to pay tribute to the Seljuqs.

By 1104, the local king of the eastern Georgia provide of Kakheti, Aghsartan II, was captured by David IV's supporters, reuniting the area. The following year, David IV defeated a Seljuk force in the Battle of Ertsukhi. Over the course of 1110 to 1118, David IV captured the fortresses of Samshvilde, Rustavi, Gishi, and Lori.

Starting in 1118 through 1120, David IV began major military reforms, including the resettlement of several thousand Kipchaks. In exchange, each Kipchak family provided David IV with a soldier, allowing him to establish a standing army. This alliance was aided by David IV's earlier marriage to the Khan's daughter.

Entering 1120, David IV became more expansionist. He invaded the neighbouring Shirvan area and the town of Qabala. From there, he began to successfully attack the Seljuk in the eastern and southwestern areas of Transcaucasia. In 1121, Sultan Mahmud b. Muhammad declared a holy war on Georgia. but David IV defeated his army at the Didgori. Soon after, David IV secured Tbilisi, one of the last Muslim enclave remaining in Georgia, and the capital was moved there, beginning Georgia's Golden Age.

In 1123, David IV liberated Dmanisi, the last Seljuk stronghold in southern Georgia. By 1124, Shirvan was captured along with the Armenian city of Ani. This expanded the kingdom's borders to the Araxes basin.

David IV founded the Gelati Academy, known at the time as "a new Hellas" and "a second Athos". David also composed the Hymns of Repentance, eight free-verse psalms.

Reign of Demetrius I and George III
The kingdom continued to flourish under Demetrius I, the son of David. Although his reign saw a disruptive family conflict related to royal succession, Georgia remained a centralized power with a strong military. A talented poet, Demetrius also continued his father's contributions to Georgia's religious polyphony. The most famous of his hymns is Thou Art a Vineyard.

Demetrius was succeeded by his son George III in 1156, beginning a stage of more offensive foreign policy. The same year he ascended to the throne, George launched a successful campaign against the Seljuq sultanate of Ahlat. He freed the important Armenian town of Dvin from Eldiguzid vassalage and was thus welcomed as a liberator in the area.

Golden age

The unified monarchy maintained its precarious independence from the Byzantine and Seljuk empires throughout the 11th century, and flourished under David IV the Builder ( 1089–1125), who repelled the Seljuk attacks and essentially completed the unification of Georgia with the re-conquest of Tbilisi in 1122. In spite of repeated incidents of dynastic strife, the kingdom continued to prosper during the reigns of Demetrios I (1125–1156), George III (1156–1184), and especially, his daughter Tamar (1184–1213).

With the decline of Byzantine power and the dissolution of the Great Seljuk Empire, Georgia became one of the pre-eminent nations of the region, stretching, at its largest extent, from present-day Southern Russia to Northern Iran, and westwards into Anatolia. The Kingdom of Georgia brought about the Georgian Golden Age, which describes a historical period in the High Middle Ages, spanning from roughly the late 11th to 13th centuries, when the kingdom reached the zenith of its power and development. The period saw the flourishing of medieval Georgian architecture, painting and poetry, which was frequently expressed in the development of ecclesiastic art, as well as the creation of first major works of secular literature. It was a period of military, political, economical and cultural progress. It also included the so-called Georgian Renaissance (also called Eastern Renaissance), during which various human activities, forms of craftsmanship and art, such as literature, philosophy and architecture thrived in the kingdom.

King Tamar's reign 

She not only shielded much of her Empire from further Turkish invasions but successfully pacified internal tensions, including a coup organized by her Russian husband Yury Bogolyubsky, prince of Novgorod.

Among the remarkable events of Tamar's reign was the foundation of the Empire of Trebizond on the Black Sea in 1204. This state was established in the northeast of the crumbling Byzantine Empire with the help of the Georgian armies, which supported Alexios I of Trebizond and his brother, David Komnenos, both of whom were Tamar's relatives. Alexios and David were fugitive Byzantine princes raised at the Georgian court. Tamar's Pontic endeavor can also be explained by her desire to take advantage of the Western European Fourth Crusade against Constantinople to set up a friendly state in Georgia's immediate southwestern neighborhood, as well as by the dynastic solidarity to the dispossessed Comnenoi. As a retribution for the attack on Georgian-controlled city of Ani, where 12,000 Christians were massacred in 1208, Georgia's Tamar the Great invaded and conquered the cities of Tabriz, Ardabil, Khoy, Qazvin and others along the way to Gorgan in northeast Persia.

The country's power had grown to such extent that in the later years of Tamar's rule, the Kingdom was primarily concerned with the protection of the Georgian monastic centers in the Holy Land, eight of which were listed in Jerusalem. Saladin's biographer Bahā' ad-Dīn ibn Šaddād reports that, after the Ayyubid conquest of Jerusalem in 1187, Tamar sent envoys to the sultan to request that the confiscated possessions of the Georgian monasteries in Jerusalem be returned. Saladin's response is not recorded, but the queen's efforts seem to have been successful. Ibn Šaddād furthermore claims that Tamar outbid the Byzantine emperor in her efforts to obtain the relics of the True Cross, offering 200,000 gold pieces to Saladin who had taken the relics as booty at the battle of Hattin – to no avail, however.

Nomadic invasions

Reign of George IV and Rusudan

Mongol yoke

George V the Brilliant 

In 1334, Shaykh Hasan of the Jalayir was appointed as governor of Georgia by Abu Sai'd.

Black Death
One of the primary reasons of Georgian political and military decline was the bubonic plague. It was first introduced in 1346 by the soldiers of George the Brilliant returning from a military expedition in south-western Georgia against invading Osmanli tribesmen. It is said that the plague wiped out a large part, if not half of the Georgian populace. This further weakened the integrity of the kingdom, as well as its military and logistic capabilities.

Timurid invasions

Turkmen invasions 

After the devastating invasions by Timur and subsequent enfeeblement of the Kingdom of Georgia, it soon faced a new threat. Timur's death in 1405 marked the beginning of the end of his Empire, unified only by fear and blood of the subjected peoples. Turkomans, particularly the Kara Koyunlu clan, were among the first to rebel against Shah Rukh who ruled most of the Persia and Mawerannahr. Qara Yusuf, ruler of the Kara Koyunlu, defeated Shah Rukh, captured Baghdad, and repulsed Timurids from western Persia. After they established themselves as the new leading power in the middle east. They took advantage of the temporary weakness of Georgians and launched attacks against them, apparently in which, George VII of Georgia was killed. Constantine I of Georgia, fearing further encroachment, allied himself with the Shirvanshah Ibrahim I to counter Turkoman advance and engaged them in the Battle of Chalagan, in which he was defeated and taken captive. In captivity Constantine behaved very proudly, which infuriated Qara Yusuf to such an extent, that he ordered his, his half-brother David's and 300 Georgian nobles' execution. Kara Yusuf put Constantine to death by his own hand.

Alexander I of Georgia who sought to strengthen and restore his declining Kingdom, faced constant invasions by the tribal Turkomans. Alexander re-conquered Lori from the Turkomans in 1431, which was of great importance in securing of the Georgian borders. Around 1434/5, Alexander encouraged the Armenian prince Beshken II Orbelian to attack the Kara Koyunlu clansmen in Siunia and, for his victory, granted him Lori under terms of vassalage. In 1440, Alexander refused to pay tribute to Jahan Shah of the Kara Koyunlu. In March, Jahan Shah surged into Georgia with 20,000 troops, destroyed the city of Samshvilde and sacked the capital city Tbilisi. He massacred thousands of Christians, put heavy indemnity on Georgia, and returned to Tabriz. He also mounted a second military expedition against Georgia in 1444. His forces met those of Alexander's successor, King Vakhtang IV at Akhaltsikhe, but the fighting was inconclusive and Jahan Shah returned to Tabriz once more.

As a result of foreign and internal struggles unified Kingdom of Georgia stopped to exist after 1466 and was subdivided into several political units. Kara Koyunlu tribal confederation was destroyed by Aq Qoyunlu, their kin tribesmen who formed another confederation, which was similar in many ways to its predecessor. Aq Qoyunlu Turkomans naturally took advantage of the Georgian fragmentation. Georgia was at least twice attacked by Uzun Hasan, the prince of the Aq Qoyunlu in 1466, 1472 and possibly 1476–7. Bagrat VI of Georgia, temporary ruler of most of Georgia at the time, had to make peace with the invaders, by abandoning Tbilisi to the enemy. It was only after Uzun Hasan's death (1478) when the Georgians were able to recover their capital. In the winter of 1488, the Ak Koyunlu Turkomans led by Halil Bey attacked Georgia's capital Tbilisi, and took the city after a long-lasted siege in February 1489. Alexander II of Imereti, another pretender to the throne, took advantage of the Aq Qoyunlu Turkoman invasion of Kartli, and seized control of Imereti. Occupation of the capital did not last long and Constantine II of Georgia was able to repel them, but it was still costly to Georgians. Ismail I, founder of the Safavid dynasty, formed an alliance with the Georgians in 1502 and decisively defeated Aq Qoyunlu in the same year, destroying their state and marking the end of their invasions.

Final disintegration

Government and society

Administration

Religion and culture 
Between the 11th and the early 13th centuries, Georgia experienced a political, economical and cultural golden age, as the Bagrationi dynasty managed to unite western and eastern halves of the country into a single kingdom. To accomplish that goal, kings relied much on the prestige of the Church, and enrolled its political support by giving it many economical advantages, immunity from taxes and large appanages. At the same time, the kings, most notably David the Builder (1089–1125), used state power to interfere in church affairs. Notably, he summoned the 1103 council of Ruisi-Urbnisi, which condemned Armenian Miaphysitism in stronger terms than ever before, and gave unprecedented power, second only to the Patriarch, to his friend and advisor George of Chqondidi. For the following centuries, the Church would remain a crucial feudal institution, whose economical and political power would always be at least equal to that of the main noble families.

During the Middle Ages, Christianity was the central element of Georgian culture. Specific forms of art were developed in Georgia for religious purposes. Among them, calligraphy, polyphonic church singing, cloisonné enamel icons, such as the Khakhuli triptych, and the "Georgian cross-dome style" of architecture, which characterizes most medieval Georgian churches. The most celebrated examples of Georgian religious architecture of the time include the Gelati Monastery and Bagrati Cathedral in Kutaisi, the Ikalto Monastery complex and Academy, and the Svetitskhoveli Cathedral in Mtskheta.

Outstanding Georgian representatives of Christian culture include Euthymius of Athos (Ekvtime Atoneli, 955–1028), George of Athos (Giorgi Atoneli, 1009–1065), Arsen Ikaltoeli (11th century), and Ephrem Mtsire, (11th century). Philosophy flourished between the 11th and 13th century, especially at the Academy of Gelati Monastery, where Ioane Petritsi attempted a synthesis of Christian, aristotelician and neoplatonic thought.

Tamar's reign also marked the continuation of artistic development in the country commenced by her predecessors. While her contemporary Georgian chronicles continued to enshrine Christian morality, the religious theme started to lose its earlier dominant position to the highly original secular literature. This trend culminated in an epic written by Georgia's national poet Rustaveli – The Knight in the Panther's Skin (Vepkhistq'aosani). Revered in Georgia as the greatest achievement of native literature, the poem  celebrates the Medieval humanistic ideals of chivalry, friendship and courtly love.

Missionary activities 
From the 10th century, Georgians had started to play a significant role in preaching Christianity in the mountains of the Caucasus. "Wherever the missions of the patriarchs of Constantinople, Rome, Alexandria, Antioch and Jerusalem failed, the Georgian Church succeeded in bringing Jesus's Cross and preaching His Gospels". This is corroborated not only by old written sources, but also by Christian architectural monuments bearing Georgian inscriptions, which are still to be seen throughout the North Caucasus in Chechnya, Ingushetia, Dagestan, North Ossetia, Kabardino-Balkaria. The golden age of Georgian monasticism lasted from the 9th to the 11th century. During that period, Georgian monasteries were founded outside the country, most notably on Mount Sinai, Mount Athos (the Iviron monastery, where the Theotokos Iverskaya icon is still located), and in Palestine.

Legacy

Artistic inheritance

See also
 List of the Kings of Georgia
 Georgian monarchs family tree
 Monarchism in Georgia
 Style of the Georgian sovereign

Notes

References

Bibliography

External links
 

 
Former kingdoms
States and territories disestablished in 1466
Former monarchies of Europe
Former monarchies of Asia
History of Transcaucasia
Medieval Russia
Medieval history of Iran
States in medieval Anatolia
Medieval Azerbaijan
1008 establishments in Europe
1008 establishments in Asia
1490 disestablishments in Europe
1490 disestablishments in Asia
Former monarchies of Western Asia
Christian states
Former empires